Auguste Audollent (14 July 1864 – 7 April 1943) was a French historian, archaeologist and Latin epigrapher, specialist of ancient Rome, in particular the magical inscriptions (tabellæ defixionum). His main thesis was devoted to Roman Carthage.

He was elected a member of the Académie des Inscriptions et Belles-Lettres in 1932.

Publications 
1890: Mission épigraphique en Algérie de MM. Aug. Audollent et J. Letaille octobre 1889 à février 1890. Rapport rédigé par M. Audollent, ASIN B001CH4WJU
1901: Carthage romaine : 146 avant Jésus-Christ - 698 après Jésus-Christ, Paris, Fontemoing, (doctorate thesis).
1905: Les Tabellae defixionum d'Afrique, Extrait du 'Bulletin archéologique'
1911: Les tombes à incinération du musée de Clermont-Ferrand, ASIN B0000DUK01
1927: L'énigme de Glozel.

Bibliography 
 Gustave Dupont-Ferrier, Éloge funèbre de M. Auguste Audollent, Comptes rendus de l'Académie des inscriptions et belles-lettres, 1943, (p. 194–199). 
 Auguste Diès, Notice sur la vie et les travaux de M. Auguste Audollent, membre de l'Académie, Comptes rendus des séances de l'Académie des inscriptions et belles-lettres, 97e année, n° 3, 1953, (p. 334–350).

References

External links 
 Notice on the website of the Comité des travaux historiques et scientifiques.

Scientists from Paris
1864 births
1943 deaths
École pratique des hautes études alumni
20th-century French historians
French epigraphers
Members of the Ligue de la patrie française
French Latinists
Members of the Académie des Inscriptions et Belles-Lettres